Michael Sahr Ngaujah (born September 7, 1976) is an American theater actor and director. Not long after his parents arrival from Sierra Leone via UK, Sahr was born in Fort Wayne, Indiana. Within five years his family relocated to Atlanta. He spent most of his early career working in experimental theater in Amsterdam. He made his breakthrough for his Tony Award-nominated performance as Fela Kuti in the 2009 Broadway musical Fela! He was nominated for his second Tony Award for his performance Henri de Toulouse-Lautrec in Moulin Rouge! (2019). On screen, he is best known for his roles in ABC's Last Resort (2012) and Netflix's Luke Cage (2018).

Early life 
Ngaujah was born to an African-American mother and Sierra Leonean Kono father. Raised in Atlanta, Georgia, he began his career in theatre there with the Youth Ensemble of Atlanta, through 7Stages Theatre in Little 5 Points.

Career

1990s–2007: Early career and Amsterdam 

As an actor Sahr began his career at age 15. He has worked with Gerrit Timmers (Onafhankelijk Toneel, Rotterdam), Falk Richter (Berlin Schaubühne, Berlin), Del Hamilton (7 Stages, Atlanta), Walter Chakela (Windybrow, Johannesburg), Tim Habeger (PushPush Theater & Film, Atlanta), Made n da Shade/MC (Amsterdam).

Sahr has also maintained a presence in the world of film since the late 1990s, with appearances in Passing Glory (TNT), A Lesson Before Dying (HBO), How I Spent My Summer Vacation (Castle Way), among other films, and more recently in The Signal (Magnolia/Pop Films, 2008), Stomp the Yard (Sony/Rainforest Films – Jan. 2007), and Blood Done (Sign My Name, 2009 release).

Sahr began as a director under the guidance of Freddie Hendricks, working as an assistant director on FH Y.E.A. productions, playing for audiences ranging from the Atlanta Black Arts Festival to the Tweetakt Festival 2000 Antwerp.

During late winter 1999, Ngaujah began the writing process that led to the short story collection Refracting (Dasarts 2004), which inspired the piece Conversations with Ice Amsterdam-BitterZoet (Dasarts 2006). Over Het Ij Festival, Amsterdam, 2007 (Made n Da Shade/Cosmic Theater).

Since relocating to Amsterdam in 2001, Sahr has worked as a theater director and developer with Rotterdam’s Lef and ACT Festival, and as a collaborator with Made n da Shade. He completed his studies at Dasarts in Amsterdam 2006, under the direction of Alida Neslo and Monique Toebosch. Under the primary influence of his work with Freddie Hendricks, as it relates to his creating of original works, integrating music into every layer of the developmental process, together with what he gained through close work with Made n da Shade and their extensive exploration into the weaving of interactive design technology throughout the base fibers of their theatre, Sahr used the laboratory of Dasarts and his encounters with Shu Lea Chang and Germaine Acogny to search for his own unique language and process, in an effort to lay a foundation that will hopefully allow him to all ways break new ground in his personal approach as a Maker.

His work Conversations with Ice deals with the question of value (who decides, who buys), within the context of the global diamond trade, Sierra Leone’s child soldiers, and its links to the Bling sub-culture in hip-hop. Sahr has appeared at speaking engagements at art conferences in Northern Europe (2007–08) about the construction and development of Conversations With Ice, with invitations pending to present this work in Sweden and Tokyo. Ngaujah continues to work with a host of inspiring artist between Europe, Africa, and the U.S. He is actively attempting to help forge stronger links between the artist community between Atlanta and the Netherlands through the development of an art festival called A to the A, celebrating and exploring Global Underground Art and Culture.

2008–present: Broadway and screen acting 
In November 2008, Ngaujah received the Audelco Award (or "Viv award") for his work on the Off-Broadway musical Fela!, under the direction of Bill T. Jones, which explores the life and inspiration of the Nigerian composer Fela Anikulapo Kuti. He also received a Tony Award nomination and a Laurence Olivier Award nomination for his role in this musical. In December 2008 Fela! The Musical was classified as the #1 theatre show of 2008 in New York, by New York magazine.

In July 2017, Ngaujah lent his voice to the video game Overwatchs hero Doomfist.

In Summer 2018 he appeared in the stage musical Moulin Rouge! as Henri de Toulouse-Lautrec. Moulin Rouge! was scheduled to begin preview performances on June 27, 2018, at the Emerson Colonial Theatre in Boston.

Personal life
For much of the 2000s, he was based in Amsterdam, Netherlands (and briefly London).

Filmography

Film

Television

Theatre
Selected credits (2008 on).

Video games

Podcasts

Awards and nominations

References

External links
 
 
 

American male film actors
American male musical theatre actors
American male television actors
American male video game actors
American male voice actors
American theatre directors
Place of birth missing (living people)
American people of Sierra Leonean descent
American emigrants to the Netherlands
Living people
20th-century American male actors
21st-century American male actors
Theatre World Award winners
1977 births